Rasim Zagirbekovich Tagirbekov (born 4 May 1984) is a former Russian professional footballer of Lezgin origin.

Career

Club
Tagirbekov made his professional debut in the Russian First Division in 2003 for FC Anzhi Makhachkala.

On 29 March 2016, Tagirbekov left Anzhi Makhachkala after terminating his contract with the club.

Career statistics

Club

Honours
Anzhi Makhachkala
 Russian First Division (1): 2009

Individual
 Russian First Division best defender: 2009.

References

External links

1984 births
Footballers from Makhachkala
Russian people of Lezgian descent
Living people
Russian footballers
Association football defenders
FC Anzhi Makhachkala players
Russian Premier League players